Sonja Ingrid Bata  (or Sonja Baťová; ; November 8, 1926 – February 20, 2018) was a Swiss Canadian businesswoman, philanthropist, collector and museum founder, who initially trained as an architect.

Biography
She left her architecture studies after her marriage to Thomas J. Bata of Bata Shoes and moved to Toronto in 1946, befriending those in the architecture community – Raymond Moriyama designed the Bata Shoe Museum, while John Cresswell Parkin designed the impressive Don Mills headquarters of Bata Shoes and the family's country house in Batawa. Though she had earlier envisioned herself to become a great architect, she set her designs on improving the Bata Shoe company.

Also in the 1940s, she began collecting shoes and studying their history. In 1979, she endowed the Bata Shoe Museum Foundation. The Bata Shoe Museum, established in 1995, is the world's largest shoe museum, and the core collection is attributed to Bata. She was the museum's chairperson.

Bata was also the chair of the National Design Council (1970s). She helped establish the Toronto French School, served as director the Art Gallery of Ontario, sat on the boards of Alcan and Canada Trustco (now TD Canada Trust), affiliated with the World Wildlife Fund, and became an Honorary Captain in the RCN and sponsor of HMCS Ottawa.

She was appointed an Officer of the Order of Canada in 1983. She died at her home in Toronto on 20 February 2018, outliving her husband for nine years.

Personal life
She had four children. Her father-in-law is Tomáš Baťa, the founder of Bata Shoes.

Awards
 Appointed an Officer of the Order of Canada (OC) in 1983.  
 She received the 125th Anniversary of the Confederation of Canada Medal in 1992.
 She received the Canadian Version of the Queen Elizabeth II Golden Jubilee Medal in 2002.
 She received the Canadian Version of the Queen Elizabeth II Diamond Jubilee Medal in 2012.
 She received the Meritorious Service Medal (MSM) in the Military Division on 19 February 2007.
 She received the Canadian Forces Decoration (CD) with 1 Clasp for 24 years service as an Honorary Captain with the Royal Canadian Navy 1989-2013.
Companion of the Canadian Business Hall of Fame
Lifetime achievement award, Retail Council of Canada
1995, Conference Board of Canada

References

Bibliography

1926 births
2018 deaths
Bata family
Bata Corporation
Swiss philanthropists
Swiss women architects
Canadian women architects
Canadian women business executives
Museum founders
Businesspeople from Zürich
Canadian women philanthropists
Canadian people of Swiss descent
20th-century philanthropists
Women founders
20th-century women philanthropists